An Internet Remote Base (IRB) is a ham radio remote base station controlled via an internetwork such as the Internet. IRBs are used to provide time-shared access to control radio transceivers or receivers, notably for use by licensed Amateur Radio operators.

History
The United States Air Force pioneered the use of IRBs with the modernization of the High Frequency Global Communications System (HFGCS) in 2000.

This was followed closely by the introduction of several solutions publicly available in early 2000s by 
 Keith Lamonica (W7DXX) and Bob Arnold (N2JEU), using an HTML form,
 Stan Schretter (W4MQ), using a locally installed client and UDP,
 and Earl Claus (KB2LWS), using Flash, Remote Scripting, and XML.

Technology
Though implementations vary, an IRB consists of several parts:
 Computer-controlled radio ("CCR") transceiver or receiver
 Computer connected to the CCR (the server)
 Antenna control interface to allow the server to control the antenna position
 An Internetwork
 Computer operated by a Radio Operator or Control Operator (the client)
 Radio Control Data Stream
 Audio Stream Interfaces
 Amplifier Control

A user interface allows the remove user to control all of the CCR's and antenna's key operating parameters, and can range from a simple HTML form hosted by the server (and accessed from the client using a web browser) to a sophisticated client-side program presenting the user with a graphical reproduction of a well-known physical radio front panel.

The IRB protocol utilizes a control data stream and an audio data stream. The control data stream can be any protocol that will support compact data transfer, while the audio data stream generally uses existing audio streaming protocols.

Control operator
An IRB Control Operator is the end-user operating the radio, remotely.

System administrator
An IRB System Administrator is the person who administers the IRB server, usually the system's owner or creator. The system administrator is responsible for managing system operators to assure that any control operator given access to the IRB is properly licensed to operate it.

Legal considerations
An IRB uses the Internet as a long microphone cord. The Internet is not governed by the FCC Wireless Telecommunications Bureau.

Code of Federal Regulations Title 47 Part 97 governs remote control of Amateur Radio stations.

Advantages and disadvantages
The IRB's primary advantage over traditional radio-link radio base stations is flexibility: the IRB can be controlled by any device with an internet connection. The IRB allows a group of users to share the cost of a radio base station and to time-share its usage. Also, while early IRBs only allowed for audio transmission, current developments allow any signal mode to be used, which opens the door to further experimentation by the amateur radio community.

The primary disadvantage of the IRB is security. Due to secure flaws present in any internet software implementation, it is feasible for an unauthorized System Operator to gain access to an IRB. Further, the cost of operating the IRB, including the electricity costs for the station itself and the server computer, along with the cost of the internet connection needed to keep the IRB connected to its users, can be prohibitive.

References

Amateur radio